Soft intellectual property (also sometimes, and confusingly (see below), abbreviated to "soft IP") is sometimes used to refer to trademarks, copyright, design rights and passing off, in contrast to "hard intellectual property", which is sometimes used to refer to patents.  Use of this phrase is controversial among IP practitioners.

The phrase "soft intellectual property" or Soft IP also refers to a system for licensing patents proposed in 2008. See Soft IP.

In Semiconductors industry the term has a different meaning described at Types of IP cores

References

Intellectual property law